Tommy Ahlers (born 18 November 1975 in Haderslev) is a Danish former businessman and politician who was a member of the Folketing for the Venstre political party from 2015 to 2021. He was the Minister of Science, Technology, Information and Higher Education in the Lars Løkke Rasmussen III Cabinet.

Biography
Ahlers is best known for the social networking and mobile backup site ZYB, launched in 2005 by two entrepreneurs from Copenhagen, Morten Lund and Ole Kristensen, and sold to Vodafone Europe BV for nearly $50m in May 2008. 
Before ZYB, where he has held the position of CEO since the company's inception, Ahlers spent six years in strategy and management, partly in the mobile industry. After ZYB, Ahlers invested in and became CEO of Podio in 2010. Podio was acquired by Citrix for $43.6 million in April 2012.

ZYB's headquarters were in Denmark, with offices in Cambridge and London, United Kingdom. The company has kept its Copenhagen base in the wake of Vodafone's acquisition, with Vodafone incorporating the firm into its Internet Services Division.

Ahlers is a regular on the technology startup conference circuit, speaking at the likes of Mobile 2.0 Europe, DLD, the European Directory Marketplace Conference and TheNextWeb, where he was an award winner in 2007.

Ahlers participated in the Danish version of the Dragons' Den. On 19 January 2016 he invested in Astralis, a top professional gaming team together with Nikolaj Nyholm, who is the CEO of RFRSH Entertainment, which in turn acquired the majority of Astralis in June 2017.

On 2 May 2018, Tommy Ahlers was appointed minister for Higher Education and Science in Denmark. He served until 27 June 2019 when the cabinet was dissolved and the Frederiksen Cabinet took over.

Personal life
Ahlers came out as bisexual in July 2018. Ahlers has two children from a straight marriage which ended in 2012.
He said that he exclusively dated men after splitting from his wife, but later began dating a woman.

References

External links
 

1975 births
Living people
People from Haderslev Municipality
21st-century Danish businesspeople
Danish chief executives
Danish company founders
Danish LGBT politicians
Danish bisexual people
Bisexual men
Bisexual politicians
LGBT conservatism
LGBT legislators
Venstre (Denmark) politicians
Government ministers of Denmark
Danish Ministers of Higher Education and Science
Members of the Folketing 2019–2022